Franklin Township is a township in Polk County, Iowa, United States.

History
Franklin Township was organized in 1856.

References

Townships in Polk County, Iowa
Townships in Iowa
1856 establishments in Iowa
Populated places established in 1856